Ebimo West Anderson (born 31 August 1989) is a Nigerian footballer who plays for Zwegabin United.

References

Living people
1989 births
Nigerian footballers
Nigerian expatriate footballers
Association football defenders
Maccabi Haifa F.C. players
Maccabi Ahi Nazareth F.C. players
Maccabi Ironi Bat Yam F.C. players
Ayeyawady United F.C. players
Rakhine United F.C. players
Zwegabin United F.C. players
Yangon United F.C. players
Israeli Premier League players
Liga Leumit players
V.League 1 players
Myanmar National League players
Expatriate footballers in Israel
Expatriate footballers in Vietnam
Expatriate footballers in Myanmar
Nigerian expatriate sportspeople in Israel
Nigerian expatriate sportspeople in Vietnam
Nigerian expatriate sportspeople in Myanmar